Katherine Sherwood Bonner McDowell (February 26, 1849 – July 22, 1883) was an American female author and feminist during America's Gilded Age. She is also known as Sherwood Bonner, her pen name.

Born in Holly Springs, Mississippi on February 26, 1849, to a wealthy and aristocratic family, Bonner left both her husband and child behind to pursue her literary dreams.

Childhood and early life

Bonner was born in Holly Springs, Mississippi on February 26, 1849. Bonner's father was an Irish immigrant who married the daughter of a rich plantation family during the antebellum period. However, the Bonner family luck changed during the American Civil War when her home was occupied by Union soldiers. A childhood of privilege gave way to an early womanhood of decreased possibilities and genteel poverty. Despite being "innately literary" from early childhood, her traditional upbringing and the prevailing societal attitudes offered Bonner little recourse other than marriage.

According to Bonner's scrapbook, her first story, "Laura Capello: A Leaf from a Traveller’s Note Book", was published in the Boston Ploughman when she was 15. However, Anne Razey Gowdy's edited edition of one of Bonner's samplers states that the story wasn't published until 1869, shortly before Bonner turned 20.

She married Edward McDowell on Valentines Day in 1871, at the age of twenty-one.

The road to Boston

Following their marriage, Bonner moved with her new husband to Texas and she gave birth to a daughter, Lilian, on December 10. Edward McDowell, however, was unable to support his wife financially, and Bonner took their daughter back to Holly Springs.

In September 1873, Bonner left her daughter in her mother-in-law's care and took a train to Boston, calling upon her acquaintance Nahum Capen, who helped her enroll in a local school.

Early literary career

Capen employed her as his personal secretary while he worked on History of Democracy. She then began worked as a secretary to Henry Wadsworth Longfellow. Under Capen and Longfellow's sponsorship, Bonner began publishing stories in Harper’s Young People, The Atlantic Monthly and Youth’s Companion. Longfellow became Bonner's lifelong patron.

Bonner was Longfellow's editorial assistant on Poems of Places. In 1876, Bonner toured England and Europe with novelist Louise Chandler Moulton and wrote travel articles that were published in the Boston Times and the Memphis, Tennessee, Avalanche. After writing articles about her European travels, and with Longfellow's support, Bonner published her only novel, Like unto Like, in 1878.

Literary works

Bonner was known for her articles that discussed local stories, in which she is said to skillfully handle the "strange dialect and negro humor". Many of her stories focused on her "gran'mammy", a character based on the woman who cared for Bonner as a child. Bonner's stories of Southern life were not tinged with bitterness over the victory of the North in the Civil War, rather she viewed the war as the crisis of the nation as a whole. Her works of note include Dialect Tales, Like unto Like, and Suwanee River Tales. Like unto Like is Bonner's only novel and is considered to be semi-autobiographical.

The end of the road

In 1878, a Yellow fever epidemic struck Holly Springs, infecting Bonner's father and brother. She returned to her hometown, risking infection, and removed her daughter to safety before nursing her father and brother before they died.

She established residency in Illinois and was able to obtain a divorce from Edward McDowell in 1881. Also in 1881, Bonner was diagnosed with advanced breast cancer and was told she had only a year to live. Wanting to leave her mark on the literary world and a financial legacy for her daughter and aunt, Bonner hid her illness from all but her closest of friends and threw herself into her work. The work produced at the later stages of her life has been described as revealing "a greater vision and… technical skill; but the pattern of development is obscured by considerable hackwork." This "hackwork" may by sympathetically attributed to the desperate hurry she was in to meet financial needs and complete her work before she died. Bonner was dictating a novel up until four days before she died in Holly Springs on July 22, 1883.

Legacy 
While her writing career was short, Bonner's mark on literature remains. Struggling in a patriarchal, misogynistic era, Bonner exemplified the sacrifices women were to make for a professional life, she was described by her daughter in adulthood as a person "whom I wish to resemble in every way."

References

Sources
 McAlexander, Hubert Horton, The Prodigal Daughter: A Biography of Sherwood Bonner (Baton Rouge, * Louisiana State University Press, 1981).
 Frank, William, L., Sherwood Bonner (Catherine McDowell), (Boston, Twayne Publishers, 1976).
 Frank, William, L., "Sherwood Bonner" in American National Biography Online database.

External links
Sherwood Bonner Collection (MUM00037) owned by University of Mississippi Department of Archives and Special Collections

1849 births
19th-century American writers
1883 deaths
Writers from Mississippi
19th-century American women writers
People from Holly Springs, Mississippi
American people of Irish descent
Deaths from breast cancer
Deaths from cancer in Mississippi